Hughesville is an unincorporated community located along the border of Holland Township in Hunterdon County and Pohatcong Township in Warren County, New Jersey. The community is named after Hugh Hughes, a lawyer from Philadelphia, who built a forge here during the 18th century.

The Hughesville Dam on the Musconetcong River was removed in 2016 to allow American shad to spawn further upriver.

References

External links
 

Holland Township, New Jersey
Pohatcong Township, New Jersey
Unincorporated communities in Hunterdon County, New Jersey
Unincorporated communities in Warren County, New Jersey